Seneca County Courthouse may refer to:

Seneca County Courthouse (Ohio), Tiffin, Ohio
Seneca County Courthouse Complex at Ovid, Ovid, New York